Attorney General Stanley may refer to:

John Stanley (Hastings MP) (1740–1799), Attorney General of the Leeward Islands 
Richard H. Stanley (1823–1875), Attorney General of the Kingdom of Hawaii

See also
Edward Stanly (1810–1872), Attorney General of North Carolina
General Stanley (disambiguation)